Murui Huitoto (or simply Murui also known as Bue, Witoto Murui or Witoto) is an indigenous American Huitoto language of the Witotoan family. Murui is spoken by about 1,100 Murui people along the banks of the Putumayo, Cara-Paraná and Igara-Paraná rivers in Colombia. In Peru it spoken in the North alongside the Ampiyacu and Napo rivers by some 1,000 people. Some Murui speakers live also outside their territories, for instance the vicinity of Leticia, Amazonas, Colombia.

Approximately 1,000 Peruvians use Murui in both its written and oral forms. The language is accorded official status and is used in schools. It is also used in churches. There are no Murui-an monolinguals in Peru: speakers of the language who do not also use another language. The language has 1,900 speakers in southwestern Colombia where it has higher social utility and standing. It was formerly spoken in Brazil, but is now extinct in that country.

Murui uses the Roman Script. There is a dictionary of the Murui language (Murui-Spanish and Spanish-Murui) compiled by an SIL linguist, Shirley Burtch (1983), and number of works concerning its grammar (Petersen de Piñeros 1994, Petersen de Piñeros & Patiño: 2000, Wojtylak 2012).

Dr. Katarzyna Wojtylak published a full referential grammar of Murui (2017, PhD thesis written at James Cook University) published by Brill Publishers (2020).

Phonology
Murui has a relatively small inventory of 16 contrastive consonantal phonemes some of which have restricted phonotactics. Murui consonant inventory is similar to two other dialects of Witoto, Mɨka and Mɨnɨka. The vowel inventory of the language is based on a six vowel system that consist of, among other sounds, the high central vowel ɨ. This trait is typical for languages from Northwest  Amazonia, such as Tucanoan and Carib languages (Aikhenvald, 2012).

Consonants
The orthographic representation is to the left; the IPA to the right.

Vowels

Close vowels  in word-initial position are heard as glides .

Morphosyntax

Murui is highly synthetic, predominantly suffixing and nominative-accusative. The language is predominantly verb-final; the organization of the constituents in the clause is usually SV/AOV. Grammatical relations are expressed through pronouns cross-referencing on the verb (with one cross-referencing position: the subject S/A). Syntactic functions can be expressed through case markers. Marking of core arguments (S, A, O = non S/A focus) is generally optional and is related to focus; marking of peripheral arguments on an NP (i.e. locative, ablative, comitative-instrumental, benefactive, privative) is usually mandatory. 	

Murui has three open lexical classes (nouns, verbs and derived adjectives (that can also be referred to as 'descriptive verbs')). Closed classes of words are underived adjectives and quantifiers, adverbs, pronouns, demonstratives, anaphoric forms, interrogative words, low (1 and 2) and lexicalized (3 < 20) number words, connectives, adpositions, interjections and onomatopoeic forms.

The majority of the word classes can occupy the predicate slot but there are restrictions as to what kind of sets of suffixes can be attached to non-verbs. Quantifiers, connectives, adpositions, interjections and onomatopoeic forms cannot function predicatively.

One of the most salient characteristics of the nominal morphology of Murui is a large multiple classifier system that consists of at least 80 classifiers.  The same (or almost the same) classifier form can be used in a variety of morphosyntactic contexts (hence the label 'multiple classifier system'). The system is semi-open due to the occurrence of repeaters (partially repeated nouns that occur in classifier slots). All types of classifiers are bound suffixes that can be either mono- or disyllabic.

Orthography
Throughout the years, the existing phonological analyses of the language have come to reflect different spelling variations with various graphemes used to describe the Witoto sounds. The first to analyze and describe the sound system of Witoto Mɨnɨka was Minor Eugene (Minor 1956). This description was fundamental to the development of the language orthography. Nowadays, there is a tendency to use the graphemes introduced by Petersen de Piñeros (1994). Wojtylak (2017, 2020) uses slightly modified spellings.

See also
Witoto people
Witoto languages
Indigenous peoples in Colombia
Indigenous languages of the Americas

Notes

References
 
 
 
 
 
 Wojtylak, K.I. (2020). A grammar of Murui (Bue), a Witotoan language from Northwest Amazonia. Leiden: Brill.
 Wojtylak, K. I. (2020). Bue uai: the phonological and grammatical status of Murui ‘word’. In A. Y. Aikhenvald, R. M. W. Dixon, & N. M. White (Eds.), The Phonological and Grammatical Word: A Cross-linguistic Typology. Oxford: Oxford University Press.
 Wojtylak, K.I. (2020). ‘Multifaceted body parts in Murui: A case study from Northwest Amazonia’. In I. Kraska-Szlenk (Ed.), Body Part Terms in Conceptualization and Language Usage (pp. 170-190). Amsterdam: John Benjamins.
 Wojtylak, K.I. (2019). ‘The elusive verbal classifiers in ‘Witoto’.  In A.Y. Aikhenvald and E. Mihas (Eds.).  Classifiers and genders: a cross-linguistic typology, pp. 176-195. Oxford: Oxford University Press.
 Agga Calderón ‘Kaziya Buinaima’, L., Wojtylak, K.I., & Echeverri, J.A. (2019). ‘Murui: Naie jiyakɨno. El lugar de origen. The place of origin’. Special issue of Revista LinguiStica entitled Línguas indígenas: Artes da palavra / Indigenous Languages: verbal arts, edited by Kristine Stenzel and Bruna Franchetto, 15(1), 50-87.
 Wojtylak, K.I. (2019). ‘Talking to the spirits: A jungle-at-night register of the Murui people from Northwest Amazon’. Special issue of journal The Mouth 4, edited by A.Y. Aikhenvald and A. Storch, pp. 78-90.
 Wojtylak, K. I. (2019). Traversing language barriers. Murui signal drums from Northwest Amazonia. International Journal of Language and Culture 6(1), pp. 195-216. (A special issue Creativity in Language, edited by Alexandra A. Aikhenvald, Andrea Hollington, Nico Nassenstein, and Anne Storch).
 Wojtylak, K.I. (2018). ‘Comparative constructions in Murui (Witotoan, Northwest Amazonia)’. In K.I. Wojtylak and Y. Treis (Eds.), On the Expression of Comparison: Contributions to the typology of comparative constructions from lesser-known languages. Special issue of Linguistic Discovery 16(1), 162-182.
 Wojtylak, K.I. (2018). ‘Nominalizations in Murui (Witotoan)’. In S. Overall and K.I. Wojtylak, (Eds.), Nominalization: A view from Northwest Amazonia. A special issue of STUF – Language Typology and Universals 71(1), 19-45.  DOI: 10.1515/stuf-2018-0002  
 Wojtylak, K.I. (2018). ‘Evidentiality in Bora and Witotoan languages’. In A.Y. Aikhenvald (Ed.), Oxford Handbook of Evidentiality, pp. 388-408. Oxford: Oxford University Press. DOI: 10.1093/oxfordhb/9780198759515.013.19
 Overall, S.E.  and Wojtylak, K.I. (2018). ‘Nominalizations in the Americas - Introduction’. In S. Overall and K.I. Wojtylak, (Eds.), Nominalization: A view from Northwest Amazonia, pp. 1-18. STUF 71(1). DOI: 10.1515/stuf-2018-0001
 Wojtylak, K.I. (2017). A grammar of Murui (Bue), a Witotoan language of Northwest Amazonia. PhD dissertation. James Cook University.
 Wojtylak, K.I. (2017). ‘Dance rituals and songs of the Murui from Northwest Amazonia’. Voices from around the world 1(1).
 Wojtylak, K.I. (2016). ‘Classifiers as derivational markers in Murui (Northwest Amazonia)’. In P. Stekauer, S. Valera and L. Kortvelyessy (Eds.), Word-Formation Across Languages. Newcastle-upon-Tyne: Cambridge Scholars Publishing.
 Wojtylak, K.I. (2015). Fruits for Animals: Hunting Avoidance Speech Style in Murui. In Proceedings of the 41st Annual Meeting of the Berkeley Linguistic Society. University of California at Berkeley.

Languages of Colombia
Witotoan languages
Languages of Peru